Vaccinium cylindraceum, known by its common names such as Azores blueberry, (Portuguese: uva-da-serra, uva-do-mato) is a semi-deciduous species of Vaccinium endemic to the Azores. It has gained the Royal Horticultural Society's Award of Garden Merit as an ornamental.

Description 
This shrub can reach up to 3 meters in height. It is also a hermaphrodite. The serrated leaves are elongated and have sharp tips. Initially red, the apical shoots may have a bright red colour. The flowers are trumpet-shaped, with a pinkish white colour, and usually occur in clusters. In autumn the leaves may change to a reddish-yellow. The black fruit is a pseudo-berry, and are said to be juicy and fleshy.

Distribution and habitat 
This plant can be found at all of the islands in Azores, apart from Graciosa.

This species can be found at elevations between 380 - 1,400m.

Cultivation 
The Azores blueberry flowers between May and June. It should be grown in acidic, loam, well-drained soil. It can be grown in light-shade or no shade.

It can be propagated by seed or by cuttings.

References

cylindraceum
Endemic flora of the Azores
Plants described in 1817